Events in the year 2021 in Cyprus.

Incumbents

 President: Nicos Anastasiades
 President of the Parliament: Adamos Adamou

Events
Ongoing — COVID-19 pandemic in Cyprus and Cyprus dispute
12 January – At an overcrowded migrant camp housing 1,500 people, 600 of whom are in quarantine for COVID-19, 25 people are injured in a fight.
3 July – During a week-long heat wave that sees temperatures surpass 40 °C (104 °F), wildfires break out in Limassol District, leading to the deaths of four Egyptian men before being put out two days later with assistance from Greece, Israel, Italy, and the United Kingdom.

Deaths
3 January – Michalakis Leptos (born  1936), property developer.
26 April – Vassos Lyssarides (born 1920), politician, president of the House of Representatives (1985–1991) and founder of EDEK.

See also
Northern Cyprus

References

 
2020s in Cyprus
Years of the 21st century in Cyprus
Cyprus
Cyprus
Cyprus